The 1998 Football League Cup Final was a football match played between Chelsea and Middlesbrough on 29 March 1998 at Wembley Stadium. Chelsea, under new manager Gianluca Vialli, won with two extra time goals and won the UEFA Cup Winners' Cup later that season. Middlesbrough's second consecutive defeat in the final was followed by promotion back to the Premier League after just one season.

Both teams were restricted to shots from distance. This all changed in extra time when Chelsea took control. Frank Sinclair, a villain in the 1994 FA Cup Final defeat when conceding a penalty and slipping to allow Mark Hughes to score, became the hero in this match. He started the move that ended with his header finding the corner of the Middlesbrough net to open the scoring. Chelsea's second goal came from Roberto Di Matteo. A corner played into the near post was not cleared by the Boro defence and Di Matteo was able to side foot the ball into the net on the half-volley. Di Matteo had come back to haunt Middlesbrough as he had scored the opening goal when the same sides met in the 1997 FA Cup Final the previous season. Once again Chelsea had won 2–0.

Road to Wembley

Match facts

1998
League Cup Final 1998
League Cup Final 1998
1997–98 Football League
March 1998 sports events in Europe
1998 sports events in London